Abercorn is a village in Scotland (United Kingdom). 

Abercorn may also refer to:

Places

Africa
 Mbala, Zambia, a town in Zambia (then Northern Rhodesia) formerly known as Abercorn
 The former Roman Catholic Diocese of Abercorn (Northern Rhodesia), originally an apostolic vicariate, now the Zambian diocese of Mpika
 Shamva, a village in Zimbabwe (then (Southern) Rhodesia) formerly known as Abercorn

Australia
 Abercorn, Queensland, a town and locality in the North Burnett Region

Europe
 Abercorn, a bar and restaurant in Belfast where the Abercorn Restaurant bombing occurred
 Abercorn Place, a tram stop in Blackpool (England)
 Abercorn Primary School, a school in Banbridge, Northern Ireland (UK)
 Abercorn School, a school in London

North America
 Abercorn Common, a shopping centre in Savannah, United States
 Abercorn, Quebec, a village in Canada

Other uses
 The former Roman Catholic Diocese of Abercorn (Scotland), now a Catholic titular see
 Abercorn F.C., a football club in Scotland
 Duke of Abercorn, a title in the peerage of Scotland